Tetsutarō, Tetsutaro or Tetsutarou (written: 鉄太郎 or 哲太郎) is a masculine Japanese given name. Notable people with the name include:

, Japanese film director
, Japanese diver
, Japanese military theorist and Imperial Japanese Navy admiral

Japanese masculine given names